Samuel Yen-Liang Yin is a Taiwanese billionaire businessman and philanthropist.  He is best known for the establishment of the Tang Prize, and as chairman of the Ruentex Financial Group.

Education
Yin studied history at Chinese Culture University. He received a master's degree in business at the National Taiwan University in 1982, and a PhD in business at the National Chengchi University in 1986. In 2004, Yin was named fellow of the Chinese Institute of Civil and Hydraulic Engineering. In 2008, he was invited to join Russia's International Academy of Engineering and awarded the Engineering Prowess Medal, the academy's highest honour. In 2010, Yin received the Henry L. Michel Award for Industry Advancement of Research by the  American Society of Civil Engineers (ASCE) for his contribution in the area of construction technology research. He was the first person without an academic background in engineering to receive the award.

Career
Yin is the head of the Ruentex Financial Group which invests in Taiwan and China. Ruentex is most known for their construction investments as well as grocery, retail chain RT Mart.

In Taiwan and China, he is recognized as a promoter of entrepreneurship and startups. In 2014, Yin was named as one of the key investors in Gogoro, an electric scooter startup in Taiwan.

Philanthropy
Yin has stated that he plans to donate 95% of his net wealth to charity, especially those relating to science, arts, law and politics.

Yin established the Tang Prize in December 2012, funded by US$100 million of his own capital. The prize is touted as the Asian equivalent of the Nobel Prize. The mission of the prize is to promote research that is beneficial to the world and humankind, promote Chinese culture and make the world a better place. The prize pays out the equivalent of US$1.7 million in categories of sustainable development, biopharmaceutical science, sinology and rule of law.

Yin also provides financial and leadership support for the following foundations in Taiwan and China: the Yin Xun-Ruo Educational Foundation, the Yin Shu-Tien Medical Foundation, the Kwang-Hua Education Foundation, and the Guanghua School of Management of Peking University. In 2016, Yin donated US$12.8 million to the Scripps Research Institute to "contribute to the building of new state-of-the-art laboratories".

Personal life
Yin is married to Wang Chi-Fan (王绮帆) and has one son and one daughter.

He is an experienced offshore sailor and commissioned the construction of two yachts, Sea Eagle and Sea Eagle II, the latter being the world's largest aluminium sailing yacht.

References

Living people
Taiwanese billionaires
1950 births
Businesspeople from Taipei
Chinese Culture University alumni
National Taiwan University alumni
National Chengchi University alumni
Giving Pledgers
21st-century philanthropists